Greenvale may refer to

In Australia

Greenvale, Victoria, a suburb of Melbourne, Australia
Greenvale Football Club
Greenvale, New South Wales, a rural community in the Riverina
Greenvale, Queensland, town and former nickel mining community, located on the Lynd Highway north of Charters Towers, Queensland

In Canada
Greenvale, Prince Edward Island

In the United States
Greenvale, New York, on Long Island
Greenvale (LIRR station)
Greenvale, Tennessee
Greenvale Township, Dakota County, Minnesota
Greenvale, a home on the National Register of Historic Places, located in Long Beach, Mississippi

In fiction
Greenvale is a fictional small town in the video game Deadly Premonition

See also
 Green Valley (disambiguation)
 Greendale (disambiguation)
 Greendell (disambiguation)